Stawiszyn is a town in Kalisz County, Greater Poland Voivodeship, Poland, with 1,569 inhabitants (2006). It is the urban part of the larger Stawiszyn Commune, a mixed urban-rural municipality (gmina miejsko-wiejska). The town has a land area of only 0.99 km², and is the smallest town in geographical area in Poland.

External links
Official website (in Polish)

Cities and towns in Greater Poland Voivodeship
Kalisz County